Charles von Buchwald (22 October 1880 in Bjerringbro, Viborg – 19 November 1951 in Hørsholm) was a Danish amateur football (soccer) player, who played seven games as a defender for the Denmark national football team.

Buchwald's parents were August Detlev Friis (von) Buchwald (1830-1906), owner of the estate Friisholt, and Johanne Marie Charlotte von Arenstorff (1847-1901), and he belonged to and old a noble family from Holstein. He had a career as a lawyer.

He won silver medals at the 1908 and 1912 Summer Olympics. He also won a gold medal with the unofficial Danish team at the 1906 Summer Olympics. In his club career, Buchwald played for Danish teams ØB and AB.

He represented Denmark at the 1906 Summer Olympics in Athens, participating in the unofficial football tournament, which Denmark won. He took part in the first official Danish national team game, played at the 1908 Summer Olympics, as Denmark won 9–0 against France B. He played all three Danish games at the tournament, and helped the team win silver medals. Four years later, Buchwald once again played all three games. In the final game, against Great Britain, Buchwald was injured in the 30th minute of the game, with Denmark trailing Great Britain 1–2. As the rules did not allow substitutions, Denmark finished the game with one man less, losing 2–4.

References

External links
 Danish national team profile
 DatabaseOlympics profile

1880 births
1951 deaths
People from Viborg Municipality
People from Hørsholm Municipality
Danish men's footballers
Denmark international footballers
Footballers at the 1906 Intercalated Games
Footballers at the 1908 Summer Olympics
Footballers at the 1912 Summer Olympics
Olympic footballers of Denmark
Olympic silver medalists for Denmark
Olympic medalists in football
Danish jurists
Danish people of German descent
Medalists at the 1912 Summer Olympics
Medalists at the 1908 Summer Olympics
Association football defenders
Sportspeople from the Central Denmark Region
Sportspeople from the Capital Region of Denmark